Abondance is a commune in the Haute-Savoie department in the Auvergne-Rhône-Alpes region in south-eastern France.

It lies in the French Alps just south of Lake Geneva on the Swiss border. The people of this commune are referred to as Abondanciers.

Abondance has given its name to a variety of cheese made in the region, the breed of cattle from whose milk the cheese is made and the valley in which it stands. Other villages in the Vallee D'Abondance are Chatel and La Chapelle D'Abondance. It is a small and quiet town with several bars, hotels, restaurants, a bank, some food and ski/outdoor shops and a lively Sunday morning Market serving the Vallee D'Abondance. One of its features is the 14th century Abbey. The commune was founded around the year 1040.

In the 2006–2007 ski season, a year of very poor snowfall, a decision was made to shut down the town's ski area after a long period of loss-making. The town's plea for government aid to support the resort was denied due to its unlikeliness to return to profit due to lack of snow. However, the resort reopened in 2009–10 and each winter since has remained open throughout the season. L'Essert is the name of the town's ski area and it has 7 lifts and 13 runs of which there are two nursery slopes, 6 blue runs, 3 red and 2 black  and a mountain restaurant. Ecole du Ski Francais operates in Abondance. In addition to downhill skiing, the resort has 10 km of cross country ski and snow shoe trails. Summer visitors go to Abondance for the walking, history and outdoor activities.

Abondance is home to the international boarding school Sainte Croix des Neiges.

Population

References

External links

  Official website

Communes of Haute-Savoie